Geastrum saccatum, commonly known as the rounded earthstar, is a species of mushroom belonging to the genus Geastrum. It has a worldwide distribution and is found growing on rotting wood. It is considered inedible by mushroomers because of its bitter taste. It is a common mushroom, but collections are at their peak during late summer. The opening of the outer layer of the fruiting body in the characteristic star shape is thought to be due to a buildup of calcium oxalate crystals immediately prior to dehiscence. G. saccatum is distinguished from other earthstars by the distinct circular ridge or depression surrounding the central pore. In Brazil, its common name translates to "star of the land".

Description

Initially, the fruiting body is egg-shaped—similar in appearance to puffballs—and has strands of mycelia (rhizomorphs) at the base that attach it to the growing surface. The 'skin,' or peridium, is composed of two separate layers: the outer layer (exoperidium), which is a golden tan to yellowish-brown color, separates away from the inner basidiocarp and splits into five to eight rays that curve backward (recurve) to the base. Unlike some other members of the genus Geastrum (such as G. fornicatum) the arms do not push the basidiocarp off the ground; rather, it lies flat. The inner spore-bearing basidiocarp is  broad, and has a central pore surrounded by a circular dull-brown apical disc; the disc is distinctly ridged or depressed. The inside of the interior sphere is white when young, but matures into a mass of brown, powdery spores mixed with thick-walled fibres known as capillitium. The species is inedible.

Spores

The spores are rounded, with warts, and have dimensions of 3.5–4.5 µm.

Habitat and distribution

Geastrum saccatum is saprobic, and grows scattered or clustered together in leaf litter of humus, usually in late summer and fall. It has a cosmopolitan distribution, and is well adapted to tropical regions. It is common in Hawaiian dry forests. The species has been collected in the United States, Argentina, Uruguay, Brazil, Canada, China, Congo, Cuba, Mexico, Panama, South Africa, West Africa, Tanzania, India,  and Tobago.

Mechanism of dehiscence

A study has shown that the formation of calcium oxalate crystals on the hyphae that form the endoperidial layer of the basidiocarp is responsible for the characteristic opening (dehiscence) of the outer peridial layers. Calcium oxalate is a common compound found in many fungi, including the earthstars. Curtis Gates Lloyd was the first to note the presence of these crystals on the endoperidium of Geaster calceus (now known as Geastrum minimum). The formation of calcium oxalate crystals stretches the layers of the outer walls, pushing the inner and outer layers of the peridium apart.

Bioactive compounds
A β-glucan–protein complex extracted from Geastrum saccatum was isolated and analysed and shown to have antiinflammatory, antioxidant, and cytotoxic activities. It is suggested that the mechanism for the antiinflammatory activity is due to inhibition of the enzymes nitric oxide synthase and cyclooxygenase.

Similar species
The related species Geastrum fimbriatum does not have an apical disc, and its pores are slightly smaller. G. saccatum may be distinguished from G. indicum by the absence of loose tissue forming a collar around the base of the endoperidium. Other similar species include G. fornicatum and G. triplex.

See also
Medicinal mushrooms

References

Further reading 
Mushrooms (Eyewitness Handbooks), by Thomas Laessoe, with Gary Lincoff, DK Publishing, New York, 1998, 304 pages, flexible vinyl. 

saccatum
Fungi of North America
Fungi of Europe
Fungi described in 1813
Inedible fungi
Taxa named by Elias Magnus Fries